Central Glass and Ceramic Research Institute (CGCRI) is a Kolkata-based National Research Institute under the Council of Scientific and Industrial Research, India. Established in 1950, it focuses on the area of glass, ceramics, mica, refractories etc.

References

External links
 

Research institutes in Kolkata
Glass engineering and science
Research institutes in West Bengal
Ceramics
1950 establishments in West Bengal
Research institutes established in 1950